Humajalso (possibly from Aymara for spring, source,) is a mountain in the Andes of southern Peru, about  high. It is located in the Moquegua Region, Mariscal Nieto Province, Carumas District.

References

Mountains of Moquegua Region
Mountains of Peru